Aleš Čermák (born 1 October 1994) is a Czech football player who currently plays for Bohemians 1905 on loan from Viktoria Plzeň in the Czech First League.

References

External links

Czech footballers
Czech Republic youth international footballers
Czech Republic under-21 international footballers
1994 births
Footballers from Prague
Living people
Czech First League players
AC Sparta Prague players
Loko Vltavín players
FK Mladá Boleslav players

Association football midfielders
FC Viktoria Plzeň players
FC Hradec Králové players
Czech National Football League players
Bohemians 1905 players